Elbert Clifton Daniel, Jr. (September 19, 1912 – February 21, 2000) was an American newspaperman who was the managing editor of The New York Times from 1964 to 1969. Before assuming the top editorial job at the paper, he served as the paper's London and Moscow bureau chief.

Clifton Daniel was married to former United States President Harry S. Truman's daughter, Margaret on April 21, 1956, at Trinity Episcopal Church in Independence, Missouri. The couple resided in Washington, D.C., and New York City.

Biography
Daniel was born to Elbert Clifton Daniel, the mayor and druggist of Zebulon, North Carolina, and Elvah T. Jones Daniel in 1912. Having heart disease, Clifton Daniel suffered a stroke and succumbed on February 21, 2000, at his Park Avenue apartment in Manhattan, aged 87.

He and his wife Margaret, who died in January 2008, had four sons. His 41-year-old son William Wallace Daniel followed his father in death a little over six months later on September 4, 2000, after being hit by a taxicab in Manhattan.

Daniel appeared as a contestant on the July 15, 1956, episode of What's My Line?, and as a guest panelist on the June 16, 1957, episode

References

External links
 Oral History Interview with E. Clifton Daniel - The Harry S. Truman Library and Museum
 Obituary of Clifton Daniel - The New York Times
 
 
Clifton Daniel papers, Manuscripts and Archives Division, The New York Public Library.

1912 births
2000 deaths
Truman family
People from the Upper East Side
The New York Times editors
People from Zebulon, North Carolina
Missouri Democrats
New York (state) Democrats
20th-century American male writers
Managing editors